The Stetson Hatters men's basketball team represents Stetson University in DeLand, Florida, United States. The team currently competes in the ASUN Conference. They play their home games at the Edmunds Center. The Hatters are one of 45 Division I programs to have never appeared in the NCAA Division I men's basketball tournament.

Postseason tournaments

CBI results
The Hatters have appeared in two College Basketball Invitational (CBI) tournaments. Their combined record is 1–2.

NCAA Division II Tournament results
The Hatters have appeared in three NCAA Division II Tournaments. Their combined record is 3–4.

NAIA Tournament results
The Hatters have appeared in five NAIA Tournaments. Their combined record is 3–5.

Notable alumni
Corey Walden, professional basketball player, 2019 Israeli Basketball Premier League MVP

References

External links